By law, "the Sundays and the public holidays remain protected as days of rest from work and of spiritual elevation" (Art. 139 WRV, part of the German constitution via Art. 140 GG). Thus all Sundays are, in a manner, public holidays – but usually not understood by the term "holiday" (except for, normally, Easter Sunday and Pentecost Sunday).

Public holidays apart from the Sundays (there must be some of them constitutionally) can be declared by law by either the Federation or the Länder for their respective jurisdictions. By federal law, only the German Unity Day is made a holiday at present (Unity Treaty, Art. 2 sect. 2); the others, even the ones celebrated all over Germany, are made holidays by state legislation.

List by state

Notes 
 – Public holiday is celebrated in that state.

In addition, the state of Brandenburg formally declared Easter Sunday and Pentecost Sunday as public holidays. As these are Sundays anyway, they have been left out by the other states, nor counted in the table above (the state of Hesse even declared all Sundays public holidays).

Quiet days 
A couple of days are designated stille Tage (quiet days) by state legislation, which regularly means that public dancing events, music at inns (if live or if not much quieter than usual) etc. are prohibited.

Some public holidays are quiet days:
 Good Friday
 Prayer and Repentance Day (where it is a public holiday and in a couple of other states)
 All Saints (where it is a public holiday)
One de facto public holiday (not determined by law, because it is always on a Sunday, but with officially organized celebrations) is a quiet day:
 Memorial Day (33rd Sunday of Ordinary Time)
One other Sunday is a quiet day:
 Totensonntag (the German-Protestant equivalent of All Souls Day), on the last Sunday of the ecclesiastical year
Some days may be quiet days without being public holidays:
 Christmas Eve (beginning in the afternoon, in some states)
 Ash Wednesday (in Bavaria)
 Holy Thursday (in some states; in some of them beginning in the evening)
 Holy Saturday (in some states)
 All Souls' Day (in Lower Saxony and the Saarland)

In a limited number of cases – apart from All Saints which, however, has long been associated in popular understanding with remembrance of the dead. The status of quiet days is also given to festivities joyous in nature: in Hesse, the highest Christian holidays are half-quiet days (until midday) and in Rhineland-Palatinate, Easter Sunday and Christmas Day are two-thirds-quiet days (until 16 o'clock). For details see the German article on the dancing ban.

Flag days 
A yet third category that may, sometimes, be called "holidays" in a sense are the "flag days" (Beflaggungstage). Only the very highest institutions, and the military, use the national flags at every day, so the directives when flags are to be displayed mark the days in question as special.

Flags are to be shown by Federal Decree on
 Holocaust Memorial Day (27 January, half-mast)
 Labour Day (1 May)
 Europe Day (9 May)
 Constitution Day (23 May)
 Remembrance of 17 June. This day was public holiday under the title of "German Unity Day" from 1954 until 1990 when that unity actually was achieved.
 World Refugee Day (20 June)
 Remembrance of 20 July
 German Unity Day (3 October)
 Memorial Day (half-mast) (two Sundays before the first day of Advent)
 Election Day (Bundestag, European Parliament)
and by state decrees on other days, such as election days for state parliaments, state constitution days, anniversary of the election of the Federal President (in Berlin) and so forth.

Frequently flags are ordered ad hoc to be shown at half-mast in cases of national mourning.

Unofficial holidays 
Either Carnival Monday ("Rosenmontag") or Mardi Gras is a de facto holiday in some towns and cities in Catholic western and southern Germany which have a strong Carnival tradition.

Also, Christmas-Eve is developing into a sort of semi-holiday: from the middle of the afternoon, it is practically treated as a holiday, and while in the morning shops are still open, working for other businesses (apart from those that work even on holidays) is becoming more and more unusual; schools are closed in any case.

Customs about holidays 
Ascension Day (Christi Himmelfahrt) and Corpus Christi (Fronleichnam) are both always on Thursdays. By taking only one day's leave, employees can have a four-day weekend.

The Three Kings Day, better known as Epiphany, is 6 January, the day after the 12 days of Christmas. In parts of Germany, it has its own local customs.

Public holidays in the former German Democratic Republic

See also 
 Holidays in Nazi Germany

References 

 
Germany
Holidays